Business travel is travel undertaken for work or business purposes, as opposed to other types of travel, such as for leisure purposes or regularly commuting between one's home and workplace.

Jobs involving business travel
In the twenty-first century, many jobs involve periodic or frequent business travel. Common careers involving business travel include:

 Salespeople
 Sales engineers
 Executives
 Field engineers
 Project managers
 Trainers
 Consultants

Additionally, it is common to see doctors, nurses, and other medical professionals flying for work. Often lawyers, politicians, athletes, clergy, military, academics, and journalists conduct business travel on a regular basis. Many organisations require their staff to take account of a travel policy when deciding whether, how, and at what cost to travel for business. Such a policy is derived from both the organisation's policies on expenditure and value for money, and the exercise of its duty of care to its staff. The contribution of corporate travel policies to employees' job satisfaction has been noted by travel management and HR professionals. Whilst management approval for travel may be important in many businesses, it has been noted that some organizations are relaxing or ending the requirement for pre-trip approval.

Negatives to business travel
Employees who travel for work on a regular basis often experience loneliness, depression, and reduced mental health. In 2019, 1 in 5 business travelers reported business travel negatively affected their mental health. Additionally, they may miss important family events creating additional relationship stress.

Positives to business travel
Business travel has many positive benefits for employees the largest being the opportunity to see parts of the world at the company's expense.   Today, many business travellers incorporate bleisure travel into their work travel.  Studies on cases imply performance increases during travel. According to a survey, 88% of small business owners enjoy business travel.

See also
 Business tourism
 Environmental effects of aviation
 Travel Management Companies
 Practical Tips for Corporate Travelers

References

Bibliography

External links

 Corporate Travel Leader's Outlook report on how business travel is changing post-pandemic.

 
Types of travel